The Staatstheater Nürnberg is a German theatre company in Nuremberg, Bavaria. The theatre is one of four Bavarian state theatres and shows operas, plays, ballets and concerts.

History
Its main venue, the opera house ("Opernhaus Nürnberg"), is one of the largest theatres in Germany.  It was built from 1903 to 1905 in Art Nouveau style by the architect Heinrich Seeling.  Until 1 January 2005, it was known as the "Städtische Bühnen Nürnberg".  Other venues are the play house (Schauspielhaus Nürnberg) including the small stages "Kammerspiele" and "BlueBox", and the Meistersingerhalle where the concerts of the orchestra (the Staatsphilharmonie Nürnberg) are held. 
  
Since 2018, the company's Generalmusikdirektorin (General Music Director) is Joana Mallwitz. Her initial contract, announced in October 2017, was for 5 years.  She is the first female conductor to be named GMD of the company.  In July 2021, the company announced that Mallwitz is to stand down as its GMD at the close of the 2022–2023 season.

General Music Directors
 Ferdinand Wagner (1923–1925)
  (1925–1938)
 Alfons Dressel (1938–1946)
 Rolf Agop (1946–1948)
 Alfons Dressel (1948–1955)
  (1956–1964)
 Hans Gierster (1965–1988)
 Christian Thielemann (1988–1992)
 Eberhard Kloke (1993–1998)
 Philippe Auguin (1998–2005)
 Christof Prick (2006–2011)
 Marcus Bosch (2011–2018)
 Joana Mallwitz (2018–present)

References

Literature

External links

 Official website of the Staatstheater Nürnberg
 Official website of the Philharmonie Nürnberg
 Staatstheater Nürnberg on postcards

Buildings and structures in Nuremberg
Nuremberg
Tourist attractions in Nuremberg
Art Nouveau architecture in Germany
Art Nouveau theatres
Theatres completed in 1905
1905 establishments in Bavaria